Megan Davies (born 19 January 2002) is a Welsh Rugby Union player who plays scrum half for the Wales women's national rugby union team and Bristol Bears. She made her debut for the Wales national squad in 2021, representing the team at the 2021 Women's Six Nations Championship.

Club career 

Davies began playing rugby at eight years old, initially with the Rumney Juniors boys side at Cardiff's Rumney Rugby Club, and then with Cardiff Quins, her first girls team.

She was selected to play for Cardiff Blues under-18s and Wales Emerging Under-20s, before representing her country at under-18 level and in sevens in Poland. She also took part in the Touch World Cup in Kuala Lumpur in 2019.

After playing for Gloucester-Hartpury, Davies signed with Exeter Chiefs in 2020 as an apprentice player. She made her debut for the club in a home game against Saracens, where Exeter's victory ended a 33-game unbeaten run for the defending Allianz Premier 15s champions.

In the summer of 2022 Davies signed for Bristol bears.

International career 
Davies was originally called into the Wales squad for the 2021 Women's Six Nations Championship to replace Bristol Bears' Keira Bevan, who had suffered a leg injury that ruled her out of the tournament.

She made her first start for the team in Wales' subsequent match against Scotland, winning her first cap at the age of 19.

Davies has won three caps in her rugby career to date.

Personal life 
Davies' love of rugby extends beyond the pitch. At the end of her season with Gloucester-Hartpury, Davies was approached by Exeter Chiefs coach Susie Appleby, who offered her an apprenticeship in rugby. This allows Davies to both play rugby for the club, and attend college to undertake a coaching course. In an interview, she said: “That’s a dream come true for me – to be able to almost play as part of your job. I go to college as part of the package – education is still important to me. To do both at the same time is just amazing."

References

External links 

 

2002 births
Living people
Exeter Chiefs players
Rugby union players from Cardiff
Welsh female rugby union players
Welsh rugby union players